Gonzalo Barrientos Jr. (born 20 July 1941) 
is a former Democratic member of the Texas Senate representing the 14th District from 1985 to 2007. He was also a member of the Texas House of Representatives from Austin from 1975 to 1985.

Election history
Election history of Barrientos from 1992.

Most recent election

2002

Previous elections

2000

1996

1994

1992

Lawsuit
In 1994, State Senator Gonzalo Barrientos, William Hale (then executive director of the Texas Commission on Human Rights), and Josephine Segura (then director of administration of the Texas Commission on Human Rights) were sued by John Thomas Serrato, an employee of the Texas Commission on Human Rights, for wrongful termination based on civil rights violations.  Mr. Barrientos was accused of conspiring with Mr. Hale & Ms. Segura to terminate Mr. Serrato for comments that Mr. Serrato made in a letter to the editor of the Austin Chronicle that were critical of Senator Barriento.  Senator Barrientos was dismissed from the lawsuit, but Mr. Serrato won a jury verdict for damages against the Commission in 1996.

DWI arrest
In November 2001, Barrientos was arrested and charged with DWI, a class B misdemeanor in Texas.  He later pleaded no contest, paid a fine, did community service and had his license suspended.

References

External links
Official Biography on the Texas Senate website.

1941 births
Living people
Texas state senators
Hispanic and Latino American state legislators in Texas
Members of the Texas House of Representatives
People from Austin, Texas
21st-century American politicians